The Riot (Damages) Act 1886 (49 & 50 Vict c 38) was an Act of the Parliament of the United Kingdom. It authorised the payment of compensation, from the police fund of the police area in question, to persons whose property had been injured, destroyed or stolen during a riot. The Act was repealed and replaced by the Riot Compensation Act 2016 which received Royal assent on 23 March 2016.

In the Act, the words "riotous" and "riotously" were to be construed in accordance with section 1 of the Public Order Act 1986.

The Supreme Court ruled in 2016 that the act sets out a self-contained statutory compensation scheme which does not extend to cover consequential losses.

Preamble
The preamble was repealed by the Statute Law Revision Act 1898.

Section 1 - Short title
This section authorised the citation of the Act by a short title.

Section 2 - Compensation to persons for damage by riot
This section now reads:

(1) Where a house, shop, or building in [a police area] has been injured or destroyed, or the property therein has been injured, stolen, or destroyed, by any persons riotously and tumultuously assembled together, such compensation as hereinafter mentioned shall be paid out of [the police fund] of [the area] to any person who has sustained loss by such injury, stealing, or destruction; but in fixing the amount of such compensation regard shall be had to the conduct of the said person, whether as respects the precautions taken by him or as respects his being a party or accessory to such riotous or tumultuous assembly, or as regards any provocation offered to the persons assembled or otherwise.
(2) Where any person having sustained such loss as aforesaid has received, by way of insurance or otherwise, any sum to recoup him, in whole or in part, for such loss, the compensation otherwise payable to him under this Act shall, if exceeding such sum, be reduced by the amount thereof, and in any other case shall not be paid to him, and the payer of such sum shall be entitled to compensation under this Act in respect of the sum so paid in like manner as if he had sustained the said loss, and any policy of insurance given by such payer shall continue in force as if he had made no such payment, and where such person was recouped as aforesaid otherwise than by payment of a sum, this enactment shall apply as if the value of such recoupment were a sum paid.

Textual amendments

The references to a police area were substituted, for the previous references to a police district, by sections 103(1) and 104(1) of, and paragraph 9 of Part II of Schedule 7 to, the Police Act 1996.

The words "the police fund" were substituted for the words "the police rate" by Schedule 9 to the Police Act 1964.

"House, shop or building", "police area" and "police fund"

These expressions are defined by section 9.

Section 3 - Mode of awarding compensation

This section now reads:

(1) Claims for compensation under this Act shall be made to the [compensation authority] of the [police area] in which the injury, stealing, or destruction took place, and such [compensation authority] shall inquire into the truth thereof, and shall, if satisfied, fix such compensation as appears to them just.
(2) A Secretary of State may from time to time make, and when made, revoke and vary regulations respecting the time, manner, and conditions within, in, and under which claims for compensation under this Act are to be made, and all claims not made in accordance with such regulations may be excluded. Such regulations may also provide for the particulars to be stated in any claim, and for the verification of any claim, and of any facts incidental thereto, by statutory declarations, production of books, vouchers, and documents, entry of premises, and otherwise, and may also provide for any matter which under this Act can be prescribed, and for the [compensation authority] obtaining information and assistance for determining the said claims.
(3) The said regulations shall be published in the London Gazette, and every [compensation authority] shall cause the same to be published in their [police area], and copies thereof to be at all times sold to any applicant at a price not exceeding sixpence for each copy.

Textual amendments

The words "police area" were substituted for the references to a police district by sections 103(1) and 104(1) of, and paragraph 10 of Part II of Schedule 7 to, the Police Act 1996.

The words "compensation authority" were substituted for the words "police authority" by Schedule 9 to the Police Act 1964.

"Police area" and "compensation authority"

These expressions are defined by section 9.

"Secretary of State"

This expression is defined by the Interpretation Act 1978.

"Sixpence"

The word "sixpence" in section 3(3) is to be read as referring to the sum of 2½p by virtue of section 10(1) of the Decimal Currency Act 1969.

Orders made under section 3(2)

S.R. & O. Rev. 1904, XI, "Riot, England", p. I., made on 30 June 1894, and revoked by article 13 of the next mentioned Order.
Regulations under the Riot (Damages) Act 1886, as to claims for compensation (1921) (S.R. & O. 1921/1536)
The Riot (Damages) (Amendment) Regulations 1986 (S.I. 1986/76)
The Riot (Damages) (Amendment) Regulations 2011 (S.I. 2011/2002)
The Riot (Damages) (Amendment No. 2) Regulations 2011 (S.I. 2011/2009)

Section 4 - Right of action to person aggrieved
Section 4(1) now reads:

The words in square brackets were substituted by Schedule 9 to the Police Act 1964.

Section 4(2) was repealed on 5 November 1993 by section 1(1) of, and Group 1 of Part I of Schedule 1 to, the Statute Law (Repeals) Act 1993.

Section 5 - Payment of compensation and expenses, and raising of money

Section 5(1)
Section 5(1) now reads:

The words in square brackets were substituted by Schedule 9 to the Police Act 1964.

The words "and the amount required to meet the said payments (in this Act referred to as riot expenses), shall be raised as part of the police rate" at the end were repealed by Part I of Schedule 10 to the Police Act 1964.

Sections 5(2) to (4)
Sections 5(2) and (4) were repealed by Part I of Schedule 10 to the Police Act 1964.

Section 5(3) was repealed by Schedule 30 to the Local Government Act 1972.

Section 6 - Application of Act to wreck and machinery
This section now reads:

Section 6(a) was repealed by Schedule 22 to the Merchant Shipping Act 1894. It read: "in the case of the plundering, damage, or destruction of any ship or boat stranded or in distress on or near the shore of any sea or tidal water, or of any part of the cargo or apparel of such ship or boat, by persons riotously and tumultuously assembled together, whether on shore or afloat."

The words "plundering, damage" in the penultimate place, and the words "and as if, in the case of such ship, boat, or cargo not being in any police district, such plundering, damage, or destruction took place in the nearest police district" at the end, were repealed by the same Schedule.

Section 7 - As to claimants in the case of churches, public institutions, etc

Section 8 - Compensation for loss sustained before passing of Act
This section was repealed by Part I of Schedule 10 to the Police Act 1964.

Section 9 - Definitions
This section defines the expressions "person", "police area", "police fund", "compensation authority", and "house, shop, or building".

The definition of "borough" was repealed on 5 November 1993 by section 1(1) of, and Group 1 of Part I of Schedule 1 to, the Statute Law (Repeals) Act 1993.

The definition of "Secretary of State" was repealed by the Statute Law Revision Act 1898.

Section 10 - Repeal of Acts, and provision as to references to repealed Acts
This section was repealed on 5 November 1993 by section 1(1) of, and Group 1 of Part I of Schedule 1 to, the Statute Law (Repeals) Act 1993.

Section 11 - Extent of Act
This section reads:

In the United Kingdom, the reference to Ireland must now be construed as a reference to Northern Ireland.

Repeal
In 2002, Lord Bradshaw moved and then withdrew an amendment to the Police Reform Bill to repeal this Act. He said it was widely viewed as archaic.

The Act was repealed by the Riot Compensation Act 2016 which received Royal assent on 23 March 2016.

See also
Riot Acts

Notes

References
Halsbury's Statutes

External links
The Riot (Damages) Act 1886, as amended from the National Archives.
The Riot (Damages) Act 1886, as originally enacted from the National Archives.

United Kingdom Acts of Parliament 1886